The 2022–23 USC Trojans men's basketball team represented the University of Southern California during the 2022–23 NCAA Division I men's basketball season. The Trojans were led by 10th-year head coach Andy Enfield and played their home games at the Galen Center for the 16th season in Los Angeles, California as members of the Pac-12 Conference.

Previous season

The USC Trojans finished the 2021–22 season 26–8, 14–6 in Pac-12 Play to finish in third place. As the No. 3 seed in the Pac-12 tournament, they defeated Washington in the quarterfinals before losing in the semifinals to UCLA. They received an at-large bid to the NCAA tournament as the No. 7 seed in the Midwest Region, where they lost in the first round to Miami (FL).

Off-season

Departures

2022 recruiting class

Roster

Schedule and results

|-
!colspan=9 style=| Regular season

|-
!colspan=9 style=| Pac-12 tournament

|-
!colspan=12 style=| NCAA Tournament

 
Source:

Statistics
Updated through November 30th, 2022

Team and Individual highs

Team Highs 
Updated through November 30th, 2022

Individual Highs 
Updated through November 30th, 2022

Rankings

*AP does not release post-NCAA Tournament rankings.^Coaches did not release a Week 1 poll.

References

USC Trojans men's basketball seasons
USC
USC Trojans basketball, men
USC Trojans basketball, men
USC Trojans basketball, men
USC Trojans basketball, men
USC